Abhimani Film Festival, also known as Celluloid Rainbows, is an annual LGBTIQ film festival held in Colombo, Sri Lanka. It was established in 2006, and is the only LGBTIQ film festival in Sri Lanka. The 2018 Festival begins on 18 June 2018.

Background
The Abhimani Film Festival (formally known as Celluloid Rainbows), screens local and international feature and short length movies from around the world. It is the oldest LGBT Film Festival in the South Asian region and the only LGBT Film Festival in Sri Lanka. Abhimani also aims to educate all communities on daily issues faced by LGBT people.

See also
 List of LGBT events
 List of LGBT film festivals
 &PROUD, Yangon, Myanmar
 Bangalore Queer Film Festival, India
 Chennai International Queer Film Festival, India
 KASHISH Mumbai International Queer Film Festival, India

References

External links
 Official webpage

2006 establishments in Sri Lanka
Annual events in Sri Lanka
Festivals in Sri Lanka
LGBT film festivals
LGBT in Sri Lanka
Recurring events established in 2006
Tourist attractions in Colombo
LGBT festivals in Asia